Michael Claassens (born 28 October 1982 in Kroonstad, Free State) is a former South African rugby union player that played professional rugby between 2003 and 2018. He made in excess of 350 senior appearances, including eight test matches for the South Africa national team.

He joined Bath in the Premiership in England for the 2007–08 season, where he stayed for six seasons.

He is the brother of Errie Claassens, also a professional rugby union player.

Honours
Free State Cheetahs
Currie Cup: 2005
Bath
European Challenge Cup: 2007–2008
Toulon
Heineken Cup European Champions: 2014
Top 14 French League : 2014

References

External links
Claassens itsrugby.co.uk profile
Bath Rugby profile

1982 births
Living people
People from Kroonstad
Afrikaner people
South African rugby union players
South Africa international rugby union players
Bath Rugby players
Barbarian F.C. players
RC Toulonnais players
Cheetahs (rugby union) players
Free State Cheetahs players
Stormers players
Lions (United Rugby Championship) players
South African expatriate rugby union players
Expatriate rugby union players in England
South African expatriate sportspeople in England
Rugby union players from the Free State (province)
Rugby union scrum-halves
South African expatriate sportspeople in France
Expatriate rugby union players in France